Youssouf Fofana may refer to:

Youssouf Fofana (footballer, born 1966), Côte d'Ivoire footballer
Youssouf Fofana (born 1980), French murderer (The Affair of the Gang of Barbarians)
Youssouf Fofana (footballer, born 1999), French footballer